20th Television Animation (formerly known as Fox Television Animation) is an American animation studio that creates, develops and produces adult animated television series and specials. It is a unit of Disney Television Studios, a subsidiary of Disney Entertainment, which is a division of The Walt Disney Company.

History

1999–2020: 20th Century Fox Television and 20th Television animation unit 
The studio was established on May 19, 1999. Its first project was the continued production of Family Guy for its third season, which it took over from the series' previous home at Film Roman for seasons one and two. The studio would become the home of future animated series co-created by Seth MacFarlane: American Dad! and The Cleveland Show. In 2016, Fox Television Animation assumed production of Matt Groening's The Simpsons, once again taking over from Film Roman.

Most animated projects from 20th Television Animation are subcontracted to third party animation production companies such as Film Roman, Titmouse, Inc., Bento Box Entertainment and Rough Draft Studios, but the company maintains 20th Television Animation as an in-house option. Because the company acts as a production house for hire, it is not treated as a labeled division of 20th Century Studios like Touchstone Television or Searchlight Pictures. The studio specializes in animation pre-production and post-production, while the actual animation production is handled by studios in South Korea. 20th Television Animation's frequent contractors include Digital eMation, Yearim Productions, AKOM Production, and Rough Draft Korea.

The studio maintains a location in the Miracle Mile neighborhood of Los Angeles  Its workers are represented by The Animation Guild, I.A.T.S.E. Local 839.

2019–present: under Disney Television Studios 
In March 2019, 20th Century Fox Television, 20th Television and Fox Television Animation were acquired by the Walt Disney Company and integrated into Walt Disney Television as part of Disney Television Studios. In September 2020, the animation company was renamed as 20th Television Animation starting with newer episodes of shows in production at the company.

In December 2020, it was announced that 20th Television Animation would be relaunched as a standalone unit from 20th Television. In March 2021, Marci Proietto was tentatively named as president of the company. It eventually went into effect in September with the on-screen logo for the company first appearing after the credits for the season 33 premiere of The Simpsons, the season 2 premiere of The Great North, the season 12 premiere of Bob's Burgers and the season 20 premiere of Family Guy. 20th Television Animation focuses on producing and developing animated projects targeted at adults, as opposed to their children-targeted sister studio Disney Television Animation. Under the new incarnation, 20th Television Animation would assume executive supervision of the production of all animated projects that had, up to that point, been overseen by 20th Television. This allowed series that 20th Television Animation was already producing animation for under 20th Television's watch to be brought entirely under one company, while series whose animation was produced by a third party company would retain that relationship, with 20th Television Animation only absorbing the above-the-line production and acting as the new client for the animation contractor.

On March 16, 2022, it was announced that the studio would collaborate with children-targeted sister studio Disney Television Animation, for the creation of young adult animated series, mini-series and movies for Disney+.

Filmography

Series

Specials

Short films

Theatrical

Direct-to-video

Disney+

Theatrical films

Released films

See also
 Adult animation
 20th Television
 List of 20th Television programs
 Disney Television Animation
 20th Century Animation
 Walt Disney Television

Notes

References

 
1999 establishments in California
20th Television
Adult animation studios
American animation studios
American companies established in 1999
Companies based in Los Angeles
Disney acquisitions
Disney production studios
Disney Television Studios
Entertainment companies established in 1999
Fox animation
Mass media companies established in 1999
Television production companies of the United States